Salaam Afghanistan was a one-hour TV show broadcast weekly via Satellite DGT Didar Global Television.  It was produced and hosted by Ms. H. Sahar.  The show was aired internationally live at 8:00 pm Los Angeles, California, USA time.

The show was one of the first Afghan TV shows after the fall of the Taliban.

Sahar interviewed many famous Afghan artists including Mithaq Kazimi, Farhad Darya, Qader Eshpari and many poets.

External links
 http://salaamafghanistan.com/
 https://web.archive.org/web/20070611010308/http://www.didarglobaltv.com/index.htm
 http://www.salamaf.com/

Afghan television presenters
Afghan television series
2000s Afghan television series